Viva Chennai Football Club is an Indian professional football club based in Chennai, Tamil Nadu, that  competes in CFA Senior Division of the  Chennai Football League. Viva Chennai won the 2022 CFL Senior Division and are eligible to play in the I-League 2nd Division.

History 

Viva Chennai Football Club was formed after C.M. Renjit took over Star Juvenile club from the previous owner. The club was renamed when it joined the CFA Super Division league after 2 years. Currently the club is owned by V.C. Praveen, president of Gokulam Kerala FC.

Viva Chennai won the CFA Super Division in 2022, making it biggest club achievement.

Honours

Domestic league 
Chennai Football League
Champions (1): 2022

Notable players 

 Srinivas Pandiyan
 Lenin Mithran
 Prashant Choudhary
 Kivi Zhimomi
 Seikhohau Tuboi
 Orok Essien

Affiliated club(s)
The following club is currently affiliated with Viva Chennai FC:
Gokulam Kerala FC (2018–present)

See also 
 Football clubs in Chennai
 Sport in Chennai

References

External links 

Viva Chennai FC at Soccerway
Viva Chennai FC at Flashscore

Football clubs in Chennai
Association football clubs established in 2013
2013 establishments in India
I-League 2nd Division clubs